BackupAssist is a suite of backup software for physical and virtual Windows servers that targets small and medium-sized businesses. It includes the products BackupAssist Classic, BackupAssist ER, BackupAssist WFH, and BackupAssist 365. The products support on-site and cloud backup and allows users to restore anything from a few files to an entire server (Bare-metal recovery).

Backup 
BackupAssist can perform several kinds of backup, each offering a different level of redundancy against data loss. The BackupAssist 365 product allows users to make local backups of cloud data. BackupAssist ER allows for AES-256 encrypted backup of data to an AWS or Azure cloud.

Data Recovery 
Data recovery can be performed on an entire server or on individual files. For instance, an Exchange Server can be restored in its entirety, just the database or individual mail items (E.g. E-mails, attachments, calendars, contacts).

History 
In 2001, Linus Chang founded BackupAssist in Melbourne Australia.

As of 2017, BackupAssist has customers in 165 countries worldwide, including NASA and Fortune 500 companies.

Major Releases

Reception 

 4.5/5 Stars Download.com
 10 / 10 toptenreviews.com

See also 
List of backup software

References 

Backup software
Windows-only software
Computer-related introductions in 2002